Freeway 7 may refer to:

 Freeway 7 (Greece)
 Freeway 7 (Iran)
 Freeway 7 (Taiwan)